Ballophilus fijiensis is a species of centipede in the genus Ballophilus. It is found in Fiji. The original description of this species is based on specimens ranging up to 52 mm in length with 81 to 91 pairs of legs.

References 

Ballophilidae
Animals described in 1920
Endemic fauna of Fiji